The Prix Emmanuel Roblès, readers's prize of Blois, is a French literary award established in 1990 whose aim is to reward an author of first novel. It is baptized as a tribute to writer Emmanuel Robles.

High school students, students, librarians, booksellers, members of associations, detainees in prisons or all passionate about books, come together to work on this selection, in France and abroad.
The winner of the prize is awarded a 5000 € scholarship (as of 2014) which allows him to start or continue a writing project.

Laureates of the Prix Emmanuel Roblès 
 1991: Nina Bouraoui, La Voyeuse interdite, Éditions Gallimard
 1992: Patrice Orcel, Un dilettante à la campagne, Gallimard
 1993: Bernard Chambaz, L'Arbre de vies, 
 1994: Tobie Nathan, Saraka Bô, 
 1995: Maïté Pinero, Le Trouble des eaux, éditions Julliard.
 1996: Christian Le Guillochet, L'Oiseau éventail, Lucien Souny
 1997: Dominique Sigaud, L'Hypothèse du désert, Gallimard
 1998: Bénédicte Puppinck, Éther, Éditions du Seuil
 1999: Nicolas Michel, Un revenant, Gallimard
 2000: Armel Job, La Femme manquée, Éditions Robert Laffont
 2001: Philippe Besson, En l'absence des hommes, Julliard
 2002: Soazig Aaron, Le Non de Klara, Éditions Maurice Nadeau
 2003: Stéphane Héaume, Le Clos Lothar, 
 2004: Aminata Zaaria, La nuit est tombée sur Dakar, Éditions Grasset
 2005: Jean-Pierre Ohl : Monsieur Dick ou le Dixième Livre, Gallimard
 2006: Hugo Boris, Le Baiser dans la nuque, Éditions Belfond
 2007: Carole Martinez, Le Cœur cousu, Gallimard
 2008: Marc Lepape, Vasilsca, 
 2009: Tatiana Arfel, L'Attente du soir, José Corti
 2010: Estelle Nollet, On ne boit pas les rats-kangourous, Albin Michel
 2011: Hélène Grémillon, Le Confident, Plon
 2012: François Garde, Ce qu'il advint du sauvage blanc, Gallimard
 2013: Raphaël Jerusalmy, Sauver Mozart : Le journal d'Otto J. Steiner, Actes Sud
 2014: Nicolas Clément, Sauf les fleurs, 
 2015: Mathias Menegoz, Karpathia, 
 2016: Olivier Bourdeaut, En attendant Bojangles, 
 2017: Négar Djavadi, Désorientale
 2018: Sébastien Spitzer, Ces rêves qu'on piétine

References

External links 
 Le prix Emmanuel-Roblès on Agglopolys
 Le prix Emmanuel Roblès on WEBTVCULTRE
 prix Emmanuel Roblès 2015 on LivresHebdo
 La sélection Prix Emmanuel Roblès 2016 est dévoilée ! on Livreciclic

Emmanuel Robles
Emmanuel Robles
Awards established in 1990
1990 establishments in France